Michael Anthony Bilandic (February 13, 1923January 15, 2002) was an American Democratic politician and attorney who served as the 49th mayor of Chicago from 1976 to 1979, after the death of his predecessor, Richard J. Daley.  Bilandic practiced law in Chicago for several years, having graduated from the DePaul University College of Law. Bilandic served as an alderman in the Chicago City Council, representing the eleventh ward on the south-west side (Bridgeport neighborhood) from June 1969 until he began his tenure as mayor in December 1976. After his mayoralty, Bilandic served as chief justice of the Illinois Supreme Court from 1994 to 1997.

Biography

Early life and career
Born in Chicago to Croatian immigrant parents, Bilandic studied at De La Salle Institute (then known as De La Salle High School); graduating in 1940. Bilandic joined the United States Marine Corps during World War II in 1943, serving as first lieutenant until 1945. After his time in the Marine Corps, Bilandic returned to school; receiving his bachelor's degree from St. Mary's University of Minnesota in 1947. After college, Bilandic returned to Chicago and became involved in political work. Bilandic began working in the city's eleventh ward was asked by then–committeeman Richard J. Daley to aid the Democratic party in 1948. In 1951, Bilandic later received his law degree from DePaul University College of Law. Bilandic officially began his political career after being elected alderman of the city's eleventh ward in the 1969 election, succeeding Matthew J. Danaher and taking office on March 11, 1969.

Mayor of Chicago (1976; 1977–79)
When Mayor Richard J. Daley died on December 20, 1976, the President Pro Tempore of the City Council, Wilson Frost, declared himself acting mayor. However, much of the city council disputed Frost's claim. After nearly a week of closed-door negotiations, the city council selected Bilandic to serve as acting mayor for approximately six months until a special election could be held to choose a mayor filling out the remaining two years in Mayor Daley's term. Bilandic was selected with the proviso that he would not contend in the election. Nonetheless, Bilandic chose to run in 1977 and, still in his honeymoon period, received a popular mandate to assume Daley's mantle. Bilandic defeated Democratic candidates Edward Hanrahan, Anthony Martin-Trigona, Roman Pucinski, Ellis Reid and Harold Washington in the April 1977 primary election. On June 7, 1977, Bilandic was elected the mayor of Chicago in the general election, defeating Dennis Block (Republican), Dennis Brasky (Socialist Labor) and Gerald Rose (U.S. Labor). Bilandic delivered his inaugural address and took office on June 22, 1977.

However, popular though he was at this time, his term as mayor would prove to be short and difficult. Bilandic had to face several labor disputes while in the mayor's office, including a gravediggers and cemetery owners' strike and a threatened strike by members of Lyric Opera of Chicago. The Chicago Butcher's Union worked to stop stores from selling fresh meat after 6 p.m., but Bilandic managed to work out a settlement. Bilandic also had to face social unrest in June 1977 when an FALN bomb exploded in City Hall and started a two-day riot among the Puerto Rican community. Bilandic oversaw the creation of ChicagoFest, a food and music festival held on Navy Pier. The Chicago Marathon had its first running in 1977 and Bilandic participated, finishing with a time of 4 hours. A runner himself, Bilandic arranged to have five miles of unused equestrian paths along the lakefront converted to running paths.

A 1993 survey of historians, political scientists and urban experts conducted by Melvin G. Holli of the University of Illinois at Chicago ranked Bilandic as the twenty-first-worst American big-city mayor to have served between the years 1820 and 1993.

Blizzard of 1979
During January 1979, a blizzard struck Chicago and effectively closed down the city, dropping a total of twenty-one inches of snow over a two-day period. The city's slow response to the debilitating storm was publicly blamed on Bilandic. Additionally, as part of attempts to deal with the storm, Bilandic ordered Chicago 'L' trains to bypass many intermediate stops, particularly affecting black neighborhoods on the South Side of the city, and angering that large voter base.

1979 Democratic primary

The former longtime head of Chicago's consumer affairs department, Jane Byrne (who was fired by Bilandic in 1977), ran against the mayor in the 1979 Democratic mayoral primary. Besides dissatisfaction with the city's handling of the snowstorm, other issues hindered the mayor's reelection campaign. Republicans voted in the Democratic primary against the mayor in order to defeat the Democratic machine that had dominated Chicago politics for decades. Reverend Jesse Jackson endorsed Byrne for mayor. And North Side and Northwest Side voters voted for Byrne because they were angered by the Democratic leadership's slating of only South Side and Southwest Side candidates for mayor, clerk, and treasurer. Bilandic very narrowly lost the primary, with 49% to Byrne's 51%; Byrne then won the general election with a record-setting 82% of the vote and became Chicago's first female mayor.

Personal life 
Chicago's Archbishop John Cardinal Cody married Bilandic to Chicago socialite Heather Morgan on June 1, 1977. Bilandic and Morgan had a son, Michael M. Bilandic Jr., born in 1978.

Later career and death
Following his term as mayor, Bilandic was elected to the Illinois Appellate Court in 1984, and then the Illinois Supreme Court in 1990, where Bilandic served until 2000. From 1994 until 1996, Bilandic served as the Illinois chief justice. On January 15, 2002, Bilandic died from heart failure and was interred in St. Mary's Cemetery in Evergreen Park, Illinois.

References

External links
First Inaugural Address
Second Inaugural Address

 Chief Justices of the Supreme Court of Illinois

1923 births
2002 deaths
20th-century American judges
20th-century American lawyers
20th-century American politicians
American people of Croatian descent
Burials in Illinois
Catholics from Illinois
Chicago City Council members
Chief Justices of the Illinois Supreme Court
De La Salle Institute alumni
DePaul University College of Law alumni
Illinois Democrats
Judges of the Illinois Appellate Court
Justices of the Illinois Supreme Court
Lawyers from Chicago
Mayors of Chicago
Military personnel from Illinois
United States Army officers
United States Marine Corps personnel of World War II